SET International is a satellite cable channel operated by Sanlih E-Television in Taiwan, launched in March 2000, but only broadcasts abroad.

External links
 SET International official website

2000 establishments in Taiwan
Television stations in Taiwan
Television channels and stations established in 2000
Sanlih E-Television